Ingram–Schipper Farm is a historic farm complex located near Boonsboro, Washington County, Maryland, United States. It is a two-story, four-bay Flemish bond brick dwelling with white trim and water table.  The house features a Victorian period flat-roofed one-story porch and a slate roof.  The property includes a number of early outbuildings, including a brick kitchen and wash house, three log buildings, one of which has a fireplace and appears to have been a dwelling, and a large stone barn.

It was listed on the National Register of Historic Places in 1979.

References

External links
, including photo from 1974, at Maryland Historical Trust

Boonsboro, Maryland
Farms on the National Register of Historic Places in Maryland
Houses in Washington County, Maryland
National Register of Historic Places in Washington County, Maryland